is a two-part original video animation produced by Encourage Films and directed by Junichi Sato. The two parts will be released on Blu-ray Disc and DVD on February 26 and June 25, 2014 respectively, whilst AT-X aired them on December 29, 2013 and May 6, 2014 respectively.

Summary
The story takes place in a world where certain individuals possess a power called Incomprehensible Skill of Human beings (ISH), giving them supernatural powers. One of these individuals is Amane Todoroki, a straightforward and somewhat air-headed girl who works as an idol magician for a performance team called Nought. Amane has a twin sister named Lilianne who was born without a body. Unlike Amane, whose ISH is fairly weak, Lilianne is extremely powerful and is able to lend her power to Amane, who uses it in her Nought performances. Amane and Lilianne try to spread the joy of ISH powers via magic shows, but everything changes when Amane is approached by someone from IAM, a group that puts on magic shows like Nought's, but is secretly experimenting with ISH users.

Characters

The main character, a girl who possesses ISH. Her power is weak and she cannot control it very well, but she is able to use the power from her twin sister Lilianne, who possesses an extremely powerful ISH. Amane helps put on magic shows in the hopes that people will come to accept ISH users and give Lilianne's existence a sense of purpose.

Amane's twin sister, who lost her body in her mother's womb. Due to her ISH ability she exists as a spirit form, often residing in the body of a stuffed bear. Despite being one of the most powerful ISH users, she cannot use her abilities by herself as she lacks a proper body. However, she is able to lend her power to Amane and can unleash her full power if she fully merges with her.

A popular magician from the group IAM. She's an ISH user and is sent to investigate Amane's potential. Her ability allows her to create illusions.

The leader of Nought, a group of ISH users who use their powers in magic shows. She is a ISH user but has sealed her powers away. She inspired Amane to become a performer after covering for her when she used Lilianne's full power at a young age.

A member of IAM, who is interested in Amane's potential. Unaware that Amane's powerful ISH comes from Lilianne, he believes her to be an archetype, which was thought to have been extinct.

A performer at Nought who can talk to birds. He wants to excel at magic without using his ISH power.

A performer at Nought who possesses superhuman strength.

An alcoholic fortune teller whom Amane often comes to for advice. She possesses the ISH ability to communicate with Earth, which she refers to as Gaia. 

Amane's patron who is quite doting on Amane.

A friend of Kakeru.

A friend of Amane's and a fan of her magic shows. She comes to learn of Amane and Lilianne's powers after they save her from IAM.

Another fan of Amane's shows who is often seen with Kozumi.

A fictional superheroine.

Episode list

References

External links

Action anime and manga
Encourage Films
Magical girl anime and manga
Supernatural anime and manga